"Champagne Lemonade" is a single by English singer-songwriter Ed Drewett. The single was released on 31 October 2010 as a digital download. The single was a commercial disappointment, peaking at only No. 84 on the UK Singles Chart for only one week.

Track listing 
Digital download

Chart performance

Release history

References

2010 singles
Ed Drewett songs
2010 songs
Songs written by Ash Howes
Songs written by Tim Powell (producer)
Virgin Records singles
Songs written by Ed Drewett